Keith Garland is a former association football player who represented New Zealand at international level.

Garland made his full All Whites debut in a 2–0 win over Malaysia on 30 March 1984 and ended his international playing career with seven A-international caps to his credit, his final cap an appearance in a 1–1 draw with Fiji on 20 October that same year.

References 

Year of birth missing (living people)
Living people
Manurewa AFC players
New Zealand association footballers
New Zealand international footballers
Association footballers not categorized by position